This Womb Like Liquid Honey is the debut studio album of Tara VanFlower, released on August 24, 1999, by Projekt Records.

Reception

AllMusic awarded the This Womb Like Liquid Honey three out of five stars and called it "a dreamlike, hazy surrealism envelops songs like "Opal Star," "Bugbear" and "Zygote the Nothing" as they catalog Vanflower's many vocal and musical moods, which embrace sweetness, seductiveness and madness."

Track listing

Personnel
Adapted from the This Womb Like Liquid Honey liner notes.

Musicians
 Tara VanFlower – vocals, instruments, effects
 Mike VanPortfleet – programming, engineering, mixing

Production and design
 Sam Rosenthal – design

Release history

References

External links 
 This Womb Like Liquid Honey at Discogs (list of releases)
 This Womb Like Liquid Honey at iTunes

1999 debut albums
Tara VanFlower albums
Projekt Records albums